Leslie Worth OBE (1923–2009) was an English watercolourist.

Life and career

Worth attended Bideford Art School and the Royal College of Art and later became an art teacher at the Epsom School of Art (now the University for the Creative Arts).

He lived in Epsom, Surrey, England for much of his life, frequently painting the Epsom Downs. He is noted for his works based on Dante's Inferno, and for those on roses. He had a strong interest in music and poetry, claiming this influenced his work.

Writings

 The Practice of Watercolour Painting; Pitman, London (1977)

References

External links
 Examples of Worth's watercolour paintings 

20th-century English painters
English male painters
21st-century English painters
1923 births
2009 deaths
English watercolourists
20th-century English male artists
21st-century English male artists